Eduardo the Samurai Toaster is a run and gun video game by American developer Semnat Studios for the Wii. It was released through the WiiWare digital distribution service on June 15, 2009 in North America.

Gameplay
The game revolves around players battling a series of enemies (such as spear toting carrots and robotic mangos) across 13 levels, upgrading their weapons along the way by picking up pastry power-ups dropped by them. As well as using a flying toaster mech at certain points in the game. The game also features drop-in cooperative multiplayer for up to four players.

Development
The game features an art style combining drawings covering several mediums such as pen & ink, acrylic paint and charcoal sketchings which were scanned into the game. According to the developers, the game and main character in particular were inspired by a combination of chambara movies and "silly randomness".

Reception
IGN found the art style interesting, but thought the gameplay was shallow, repetitive and generic made marginally more enjoyable with multiple players. It currently holds a score of 61 on Metacritic.

References

2009 video games
Run and gun games
Wii-only games
WiiWare games
Wii games
North America-exclusive video games
Video games developed in the United States
Multiplayer and single-player video games